Sundance is an unincorporated community and census-designated place (CDP) in McKinley County, New Mexico, United States. It was first listed as a CDP prior to the 2020 census.

The community is in the western part of the county and is bordered to the northwest by Gallup, the county seat, and to the northeast by Church Rock. Interstate 40 passes through the northernmost part of Sundance, with the closest access from Exit 26 (State Road 118),  to the west in Gallup.

Demographics

Education
It is in Gallup-McKinley County Public Schools.

References 

Census-designated places in McKinley County, New Mexico
Census-designated places in New Mexico